"Do Deewaane Sheher Mein" is an Indian Hindi song from the Bollywood film Gharaonda. (1977). The film was directed by Bhimsain Khurana. The lyrics of the song was written by Gulzar, and the music was composed by Jaidev. In 1977 Gulzar won his first Filmfare Award for Best Lyricist for this song. The song was sung by Bhupinder Singh and Runa Laila. The song has a reprise "Ek Akela Is Sheher Mein".

Awards and reception
The song received the following awards:

References

External links 
 

1977 songs
Indian songs
Songs with lyrics by Gulzar